The 2000 Hong Kong Legislative Council election was held on 10 September 2000 for members of the 2nd Legislative Council (LegCo) of the Hong Kong Special Administrative Region (HKSAR). The election returned 24 members from directly elected geographical constituencies, 6 seats from the Election Committee constituency and 30 members from functional constituencies, of which 9 uncontested.

The election saw the decline in turnout rate from 53.29 percent in 1998 to 43.57 percent. The Democratic Party was able to maintain the largest party status in the legislature by retaining 12 seats, despite its vote share fell sharply by eight percent, if including Lau Chin-shek from the Hong Kong Confederation of Trade Unions (CTU) running in the same ticket with Democrat James To in Kowloon West, from 42 percent in 1998 to 34 percent in 2000.

In contrast, the pro-Beijing rival Democratic Alliance for the Betterment of Hong Kong (DAB) raised its vote share over two years by five percent, to 29.6 percent if including Tang Siu-tong from the Hong Kong Progressive Alliance (HKPA). As a result, the DAB won 11 seats, a sharp increase of three seats from the previous election, making it the second largest political party in the legislature, despite an alleged corruption scandal involving its vice-chairman Cheng Kai-nam at the peak of the campaign. Cheng did not take his office and a by-election in December was won by a pro-democracy independent Audrey Eu.

The pro-democracy camp won 21 seats in total, of which 16 of those returned from the directly elected geographical constituencies, one seat more than the previous election which secured the one-thirds vote to veto any government's proposal of any constitutional amendment.

Change in composition
According to the Annex II of the Basic Law of Hong Kong, the number of the Election Committee constituency indirectly elected by the 800-member Election Committee would reduce from 10 seats to 6 seats, while the directly elected geographical constituency seats would increase from 20 to 24. As a result, each geographical constituency except the New Territories East was added one extra seat.

After the two municipal councils, the Urban Council and Regional Council, were abolished in 1999, the two corresponding functional constituencies were also abolished and replaced by the Information Technology and Catering seats.

Parties and candidates
A total of 155 candidates representing ten political parties and candidates who were independents or not non-affiliated ran for the total number of 60 seats. 88 of whom ran in the 24 directly elected geographical constituencies, 57 for the 30 indirectly elected functional constituencies and 10 were nominated for the 6 Election Committee seats.  
 The Democratic Party, chaired by Martin Lee, was the largest pro-democracy party holding 13 seats in the first Legislative Council term. Despite being perceived as anti-Beijing, the party's manifesto stated clear support for China's sovereignty over Hong Kong and Hong Kong's status as an "indivisible part of China." Nevertheless, the party was strongly identified with democratic principles, including "democracy, freedom, human rights and the rule of law." It believed in a rapid pace for Hong Kong's democratic development. The party filled tickets in all five geographical constituencies besides its candidacies in the functional constituencies including Education, Social Welfare and Information Technology. It was also the first time the party deployed separate tickets in the New Territories West in hope of winning three seats by purchasing seats with remainder votes under the Hare quota system.
 The Liberal Party, chaired by James Tien, was the party representing big-business interests. Its manifesto was "Energise Our Economy, Enrich Our Lives." Although its economic inclinations were the opposite of the Democratic Alliance for the Betterment of Hong Kong (DAB), it also had pro-Beijing sympathies like the latter. After the defeat of former chairman Allen Lee in direct election in 1998, the party only filled two tickets in the geographical constituencies while its core members remained relying heavily on the business sectors of the functional constituencies.
 The Democratic Alliance for the Betterment of Hong Kong (DAB), chaired by Tsang Yok-sing, was the pro-Beijing party representing the Beijing interests in Hong Kong. It called for gradual and step-by step progress towards democratisation and supported for social welfare improvements, including greater spending on education, housing, employee retraining which had given it strong grassroots supports. Holding 10 seats in the first Legislative Council term, the DAB won five directly elected seats in the 1998 election, taking advantages from the proportional representation system installed by Beijing.
 The Hong Kong Progressive Alliance (HKPA), chaired by Ambrose Lau, was a small pro-Beijing party which had a pro-business stance which assuring another voting block support of Beijing interests. It heavily relied on the seats in the indirectly elected functional constituencies and Election Committee seats. In the election, the party filled a ticket in New Territories East for the first time and a candidate with rural background Tang Siu-tong in the DAB ticket in New Territories West.
 The Frontier, headed by Emily Lau was active on human rights and environmental issues and routinely criticised both Hong Kong and Beijing governments on matters involving individual rights and freedoms. The Frontier believed the Basic Law should be redrafted and advocated democracy and freedom in China and Hong Kong. The party had strong support in New Territories East where saw its two incumbents Emily Lau and Cyd Ho got elected. Ho ran in Hong Kong Island in the coming election, targeting retiring Citizens Party's Christine Loh's seat.
 The Hong Kong Confederation of Trade Unions (CTU), presided by Lau Chin-shek, was a pro-democracy labour union. It had strong pro-grassroots and pro-labour inclination besides its pro-democracy stance. It had two incumbents Lau Chin-shek and Lee Cheuk-yan who ran as Democratic Party and The Frontier candidates respectively in the last election. After quitting the Democratic Party, Lau would run in the joint ticket with Democratic Party's James To in Kowloon West in the coming election.
 The Neighbourhood and Worker's Service Centre (NWSC) had its sole legislator Leung Yiu-chung ran for his re-election in New Territories West. Largely pro-democracy and pro-grassroots, the NWSC had its strong base in public housing estates in Kwai Chung.
 The New Century Forum, headed by Ng Ching-fai, was newly formed small party with a pro-middle class inclination. It had two members in the first Legislative Council term, Ng Ching-fai and Ma Fung-kwok, both were elected through the Election Committee, despite the two were running for re-election as nonpartisans. The party would also run in Hong Kong Island and New Territories East with tickets led by former civil servant David Lan and Law Cheung-kwok respectively.
 The Hong Kong Association for Democracy and People's Livelihood (ADPL), chaired by Frederick Fung, was a major party before 1997 until it lost all its seat in the first Legislative Council election in 1998. It had a moderate pro-democracy stance and strong pro-grassroots inclination. It filled in one ticket in its strong base Kowloon West in the coming election with chairman Frederick Fung and vice-chairman Bruce Liu.
 The April Fifth Action was a small socialist group in which "Longhair" Leung Kwok-hung was its most well-known figure. It called for radical political changes with a strong anti-government rhetoric. Leung Kwok-hung would be running in the New Territories East in the coming election.

Retiring incumbents
Ambrose Cheung, representing the Provisional Urban Council resigned from the Legislative Council as protest to the government's decision on abolishing the two municipal councils, Urban Council and Regional Council and their corresponding Legislative Council constituencies in 2000. No by-election was held due to the short period before the general election.

General result

Before election:

Change in composition:

|-
! style="background-color:#E9E9E9;text-align:center;" rowspan=2 colspan=3|Parties and allegiances
! style="background-color:#E9E9E9;text-align:right;" colspan=4 |Geographical constituencies
! style="background-color:#E9E9E9;text-align:right;" colspan=4 |Functional constituencies
! style="background-color:#E9E9E9;text-align:right;" rowspan=2 |ECCseats
! style="background-color:#E9E9E9;text-align:right;" rowspan=2 |Totalseats
! style="background-color:#E9E9E9;text-align:right;" rowspan=2 |±
|-
! style="background-color:#E9E9E9;text-align:right;" |Votes
! style="background-color:#E9E9E9;text-align:right;" |%
! style="background-color:#E9E9E9;text-align:right;" |±pp
! style="background-color:#E9E9E9;text-align:right;" |Seats
! style="background-color:#E9E9E9;text-align:right;" |Votes
! style="background-color:#E9E9E9;text-align:right;" |%
! style="background-color:#E9E9E9;text-align:right;" |±pp
! style="background-color:#E9E9E9;text-align:right;" |Seats
|-
|rowspan=5 style="text-align:left;background-color:Pink;border-bottom-style:hidden;"|
| style="background-color:"|
| style="text-align:left;" |Democratic Alliance for the Betterment of Hong Kong
|374,780
|28.40
|3.17
|7
|1,493
|1.68
|1.30
|3
|1
|11
|2
|-
| style="background-color:"|
| style="text-align:left;" |Liberal Party
|24,858
|1.88
|1.52
|0
|4,416
|4.96
|3.23
|8
|0
|8
|2
|-
| style="background-color:"|
| style="text-align:left;" |Hong Kong Progressive Alliance
|25,773
|1.95
|N/A
|1
|133
|0.15
|0.41
|1
|2
|4
|1
|-
| style="background-color:"|
| style="text-align:left;" |New Century Forum
|21,103
|1.60
|N/A
|0
|–
|–
|–
|–
|1
|1
|1
|-
| style="background-color:"|
| style="text-align:left;" |Pro-government individuals and others
|14,534
|1.10
|–
|0
|30,571
|34.34
|
|13
|2
|15
|−
|-style="background-color:Pink"
| style="text-align:left;" colspan=3 |Total for pro-Beijing camp
|461,048
|34.94
|4.55
|8
|30,571
|41.12
|9.01
|25
|6
|39
|
|-
|rowspan=7 style="text-align:left;background-color:LightGreen;width:1px;border-bottom-style:hidden;" |
|style="background-color:;width:1px"|
| style="text-align:left;" |Democratic Party
|417,873
|31.66
|
|9
|40,624
|45.63
|17.44
|3
|–
|12
|0
|-
| style="background-color:"|
| style="text-align:left;" |Hong Kong Confederation of Trade Unions
|96,752
|7.33
|N/A
|2
|–
|–
|–
|–
|–
|2
|0
|-
| style="background-color:"|
| style="text-align:left;" |The Frontier
|89,529
|6.78
|3.25
|2
|–
|–
|–
|–
|–
|2
|0
|-
| style="background-color:"|
| style="text-align:left;" |Hong Kong Association for Democracy and People's Livelihood
|62,717
|4.75
|0.75
|1
|–
|–
|–
|–
|–
|1
|1
|-
|style="background-color:"|
| style="text-align:left;" |Neighbourhood and Worker's Service Centre
|59,348
|4.50
|N/A
|1
|–
|–
|–
|–
|–
|1
|0
|-
|style="background-color:"|
| style="text-align:left;" |April Fifth Action
|18,235
|1.38
|N/A
|0
|−
|−
|−
|−
|−
|0
|0
|-
| style="background-color:"|
| style="text-align:left;" |Pro-democracy individuals and others
|54,795
|4.15
|–
|1
|9,066
|10.18
|
|2
|–
|3
|−
|-style="background-color:LightGreen"
| style="text-align:left;" colspan=3 |Total for pro-democracy camp
|799,249
|60.56
|5.59
|16
|49.690
|55.81
|9.74
|5
|–
|21
|1
|-

| style="background-color:" |
| style="text-align:left;" colspan=2 | Non-partisan individuals and others
|59,397
|4.50
|
|0
|2,729
|3.07
|
|0
|–
|0
|−
|-
|style="text-align:left;background-color:#E9E9E9" colspan="3"|Total
|width="75" style="text-align:right;background-color:#E9E9E9"|1,319,694
|width="40" style="text-align:right;background-color:#E9E9E9"|100.00
|width="40" style="text-align:right;background-color:#E9E9E9"|
|style="text-align:right;background-color:#E9E9E9"|24
|width="75" style="text-align:right;background-color:#E9E9E9"|89,032
|width="40" style="text-align:right;background-color:#E9E9E9"|100.00
|width="40" style="text-align:right;background-color:#E9E9E9"|
|style="text-align:right;background-color:#E9E9E9"|30
|style="text-align:right;background-color:#E9E9E9"|6
|width="30" style="text-align:right;background-color:#E9E9E9"|60
|style="text-align:right;background-color:#E9E9E9"|0
|-
|style="text-align:left;background-color:#E9E9E9" colspan=14| 
|-
|style="text-align:left;background-color:#E9E9E9" colspan="3"| Valid votes
|width="75" style="text-align:right;background-color:#E9E9E9"| 1,319,694
|width="30" style="text-align:right;background-color:#E9E9E9"| 99.14
|width="30" style="text-align:right;background-color:#E9E9E9"| 0.22
|width="30" style="text-align:right;background-color:#E9E9E9" rowspan="4" | 
|width="75" style="text-align:right;background-color:#E9E9E9"| 89,032
|width="30" style="text-align:right;background-color:#E9E9E9"| 96.66
|width="30" style="text-align:right;background-color:#E9E9E9"| 1.31
|width="30" style="text-align:right;background-color:#E9E9E9" colspan="4" rowspan="4" | 
|-
|style="text-align:left;background-color:#E9E9E9" colspan="3"| Invalid votes
|width="75" style="text-align:right;background-color:#E9E9E9"| 11,386
|width="30" style="text-align:right;background-color:#E9E9E9"| 0.86
|width="30" style="text-align:right;background-color:#E9E9E9"| 0.22
|width="75" style="text-align:right;background-color:#E9E9E9"| 3,080
|width="30" style="text-align:right;background-color:#E9E9E9"| 3.34
|width="30" style="text-align:right;background-color:#E9E9E9"| 1.31
|-
|style="text-align:left;background-color:#E9E9E9" colspan="3"|Votes cast / turnout
|width="75" style="text-align:right;background-color:#E9E9E9"|1,331,080
|width="40" style="text-align:right;background-color:#E9E9E9"|43.57
|width="30" style="text-align:right;background-color:#E9E9E9"|9.72
|width="75" style="text-align:right;background-color:#E9E9E9"|92,112
|width="40" style="text-align:right;background-color:#E9E9E9"|56.50
|width="30" style="text-align:right;background-color:#E9E9E9"|7.00
|-
|style="text-align:left;background-color:#E9E9E9" colspan="3"|Registered voters
|width="75" style="text-align:right;background-color:#E9E9E9"|3,055,378
|width="40" style="text-align:right;background-color:#E9E9E9"|100.00
|width="30" style="text-align:right;background-color:#E9E9E9"|9.30
|width="75" style="text-align:right;background-color:#E9E9E9"|163,030
|width="40" style="text-align:right;background-color:#E9E9E9"|100.00
|width="30" style="text-align:right;background-color:#E9E9E9"|
|-
| style="text-align:left;" colspan=14 | 9 candidates in 9 functional constituencies were elected unopposed to the Legislative Council.
|} (Total votes added up by this reference)

Vote summary

Seat summary

Incumbents defeated
Four incumbents lost re-election.

Results breakdown

Geographical constituencies (24 seats)
Voting System: Closed party-list proportional representation with the largest remainder method and Hare Quota.

Functional Constituencies (30 seats)
Voting systems: Different voting systems apply to different functional constituencies, namely for the Heung Yee Kuk, Agriculture and Fisheries, Insurance and Transport, the preferential elimination system of voting; and for the remaining 24 FCs used the first-past-the-post voting system.

Election Committee (6 seats)

References

External links
 Official Government election site

 
2000 elections in China
2000 in Hong Kong
Legislative
Legislative Council of Hong Kong
September 2000 events in China